UTH or Uth may refer to:

Universities
 University of Texas Health Science Center at Houston
 University of Texas at Houston (School of Public Health, Medical School, Dental Branch, ...)
 University of Thessaly, Greek University
 Universidad Tecnológica de Honduras

Surname
 Mark Uth (born 1991), German footballer
 Max Uth (1863–1914), German painter

Other uses
 Udon Thani International Airport, Thailand, International Air Transport Association airport code
 Untrihexium (Uth), an unsynthesized chemical element
 Ultimate Texas Hold'em, a variant of the poker game Texas Hold'em